Nate Charles Davis (born May 25, 1987) is an American football quarterback for the Duke City Gladiators of the Indoor Football League (IFL). He was drafted by the San Francisco 49ers in the fifth round of the 2009 NFL draft. He played college football at Ball State.

College career
As a starter for all of his three seasons at Ball State, Davis set the team's all-time record for touchdown passes in a season with 30 during the 2007 season. He finished his sophomore season with 3,667 yards passing, 30 touchdowns, six interceptions, and 235 rushing yards with five rushing touchdowns. As a junior in 2008, Davis led his team to 12 straight victories to start the season before the Cardinals fell to Buffalo in the Mid-American Conference championship game following five turnovers involving Davis. For the year, Davis threw for 3,446 yards, 26 touchdowns and seven interceptions. He also posted a passer rating of 164.04, which was an improvement on his 139.13 as a sophomore and 146.65 as a freshman. On January 13, 2009, Davis announced that he would forgo a senior season to enter the 2009 NFL Draft.

Professional career

San Francisco 49ers
Davis was drafted in the 5th round of the 2009 NFL Draft by the San Francisco 49ers. On August 22, 2009, Davis made his professional debut in a pre-season game against the Oakland Raiders at Candlestick Park in San Francisco.  Coming into the game in the third quarter, Davis led the offense to three scores in the fourth quarter, including a two-point conversion, to win the game. In the following pre-season game against the Dallas Cowboys, Davis completed 10 of 15 passes for 132 yards and led two scoring drives in the final quarter of a 20-13 victory.
 
On September 6, 2010, Davis was cut by the San Francisco 49ers before being signed to their practice squad on September 8 of that year.

Seattle Seahawks
The Seattle Seahawks signed Davis to a reserve/future contract on January 11, 2011, only to cut him on March 3.

Indianapolis Colts
On July 26, it was reported that he had agreed to terms on a two-year contract with the Indianapolis Colts. The Colts waived Davis on August 15, 2011.

Orlando Predators
On April 7, 2012, Davis was reported released from the Kansas City Command.  On April 17, 2012, he was assigned to the Orlando Predators.

Amarillo Venom
On May 10, 2012, Davis signed with the Amarillo Venom of the indoor Lone Star Football League.

On November 20, 2014, Davis signed with the Venom, who moved to Champions Indoor Football.

Duke City Gladiators
As of 2022, Davis is currently signed with the Duke City Gladiators

Personal
Davis' brother Jose was a professional quarterback in the Arena Football League. Jose attended Kent State from 1997–99 and holds the Mid-American Conference single-game record accounting for eight total touchdowns against Central Michigan. In 2009, Jose was named head football coach at Bellaire High School, where the brothers both played.

Nate was a four-year letter winner in basketball at Bellaire. He broke the school's record for most points in a career amassing over 1800 points. He also holds the school's record for most touchdown passes (83) and most passing yards (7,348).

References

External links

 San Francisco 49ers bio
 Ball State bio
 Statistics
 Ball State Daily News
 Nate Davis News

1987 births
Living people
Ball State Cardinals football players
American football quarterbacks
People from Bellaire, Ohio
Players of American football from Ohio
San Francisco 49ers players
Seattle Seahawks players
Indianapolis Colts players
Kansas City Command players
Orlando Predators players
San Antonio Talons players
Amarillo Venom players
Rio Grande Valley Sol players